Alamgir Hasan (born 3 October 1970) is a retired Bangladeshi professional footballer who played as a right back. During his career he was well known for taking long throw-ins which influenced his teams attacks.

Career
Alamgir's youth football journey started with the prestigious 4 feet 10 inches tournament and the Dhaka Ershad Cup. After doing well in such a tournaments, Barisal Abahani invited him to the club. In the Barisal League title deciding match against Barisal Mohammedan, many players from the main brach, Abahani Limited Dhaka were invited to play for the Barisal-based side. After the game Alamgir was invited to join the Dhaka League club. In late 1987, he started practicing with Abahani's junior team, and in 1989 he was promoted to the senior team. In the BTC Club Cup Final against Mohammedan SC, Alamgir's long throw-in lead to Golam Gauss scoring the winner. In 1991, he played for the Bangladesh U23 at the 1992 Summer Olympics qualifiers, while for the senior team he played both the 1993 and 1995 editions of the South Asian Games. However, during the 1993 tournament coach Oldrich Svab did not let him enter the field, as he preferred Kaiser Hamid at right-back. In 1994, he joined rivals Mohammedan SC, however, his career was cut short after picking up an injury during his second season at the club, this led to his retirement in 1997.

Personal life
In 2018, was part of a campaign which aided the Rohingya refugees in Bangladesh, alongside former players Kaiser Hamid and Sheikh Mohammad Aslam.

Honours
Abahani Limited Dhaka
 Dhaka League: 1989–90, 1992
 Independence Cup: 1990
 BTC Club Cup: 1991
 Sait Nagjee Tournament: 1989

Mohammedan SC
 Dhaka League: 1996
 Federation Cup: 1995

Bangladesh
 South Asian Games Silver medal: 1995

External links

References

Living people
1970 births
People from Barisal
Association football defenders
Bangladeshi footballers
Abahani Limited (Dhaka) players
Mohammedan SC (Dhaka) players
Bangladesh youth international footballers
Bangladesh international footballers